PJSC Polyus is a Russian gold mining company. It is the largest gold producer in Russia and one of the top 10 gold mining companies globally by output (2.84 million ounces of gold production in 2019). It is headquartered in Moscow and is listed on both the Moscow and London Stock Exchanges.
Polyus’ main assets are located in Eastern Siberia and the Russian Far East - in the regions of Krasnoyarsk Krai, Irkutsk Oblast, Magadan Oblast and the Republic of Sakha.

The company is controlled by Said Kerimov, son of Russian billionaire and politician, Suleyman Kerimov.

History
Polyus was founded as Polyus Gold in March 2006, as a result of a spin-off from the gold assets of Norilsk Nickel.

In May 2006, shares of Polyus Gold were admitted to listing and trading on the Russian stock exchanges RTS and MICEX (both of these later merged to form the Moscow Exchange). In December 2006, ADRs of Polyus Gold were listed and admitted to trading on the London Stock Exchange.

In 2009, the businessman Suleyman Kerimov bought a 37% stake in Polyus Gold from Vladimir Potanin. In 2015, the family of Suleyman Kerimov acquired 59% of Polyus Gold International Ltd (the parent holding company of Polyus Gold) and became the controlling shareholder of Polyus Gold. On 3 December 2015, Polyus Gold International Limited announced the delisting of its shares from the London Stock Exchange.

In 2016, Polyus Gold changed its name to Polyus.

In June 2017, Polyus’s shares were re-admitted to trading on the London Stock Exchange.

In April 2019, Polyus sold a 3.84% stake worth US$390 million in a secondary public offering on the Moscow Stock Exchange.

Operations
Polyus holds the world’s third largest gold reserves with 64.4 million ounces of proven and probable gold reserves, and the second largest mineral resource base globally with 193 ounces of gold.

Operating mines

Development and exploration
 Sukhoi Log: one of the world’s largest gold greenfield projects. Estimated gold reserves are 962 mt of ore, grading 2.1 g/t gold for 63 moz of contained gold.
 Other deposits in Krasnoyarsk Krai, Amur Oblast and Irkutsk Oblast

Ownership 
Main owner as of 2021: Said Kerimov (76.34% of shares). 21.85% of shares are in free circulation, 1.03% belong to the company's management.
In 2022 Said Kerimov sold 29.99% in Polyus to Acropol Group (belongs to Akhmet Palankoev) and gave 46.35% to the Fund for Support of Islamic Foundations in Russia. https://polyus.com/en/media/press-releases/changes-in-shareholder-structure/

Carbon footprint
Polyus Gold reported Total CO2e emissions (Direct + Indirect) for 31 December 2020 at 2,020 Kt (-380 /-15.8% y-o-y). The decline accelerated compared to the CAGR of -8.6% since 4Q'16.

References

External links

External links

 
Gold mining companies of Russia
Companies based in Krasnoyarsk Krai
Companies listed on the Moscow Exchange
Russian companies established in 2006
Companies based in Krasnoyarsk
Companies based in Moscow
Russian brands
Non-renewable resource companies established in 2006